The  2012 Honda Indy Toronto was the tenth round of the 2012 IndyCar Series season. It took place on Sunday, July 8, 2012. The race was contested over 85 laps at the  street course at Exhibition Place in Toronto, Ontario, Canada. Ryan Hunter-Reay of Andretti Autosport won the race, his third consecutive win of the season, which also gave him the series' points lead.

With his victory, Hunter-Reay became the first American driver to win three races in a row since A. J. Allmendinger in 2006, and the first American to lead the driver's points championship since Sam Hornish Jr., also in 2006. Toronto was Dario Franchitti fourth pole position of the year, but he had bad luck in one of his pitstops when he stopped too far from the refuelling device and then later a collision with Ryan Briscoe, he finished the race in 17th position.

Classification

Starting grid

Race results

Notes
 Points include 1 point for pole position and 2 points for most laps led.

Standings after the race

Drivers' Championship

Manufacturers' Championship

Note: Only the top five positions are included for the driver standings.

References

External links

Indy Toronto
Honda Indy Toronto
Honda Indy Toronto
Honda Indy Toronto
Honda Indy Toronto